The Soviet Union's 1984 nuclear test series was a group of 29 nuclear tests conducted in 1984. These tests  followed the 1983 Soviet nuclear tests series and preceded the 1985 Soviet nuclear tests series.

References

1984
1984 in the Soviet Union
1984 in military history
Explosions in 1984